Jeffrey Campbell (born 25 August 1979) is a New Zealand football player, who played for New Zealand and professionally for the Football Kingz. He ended his career in 2017 playing for Takapuna AFC. He has represented his country at U20, U23 and senior levels.

Club career
In September 2006, Jeff signed for the New Zealand Football Championship club Waitakere United for the 2006–2007 season. He also played for Waitakere United in the Oceania Champions Cup with Waitakere United winning the competition in 2007 which qualified the team for the 2007 FIFA Club World Cup in Japan where Campbell was an unused sub in their 1–2 loss to Adelaide United.

The following season, he joined Auckland City FC and again played in the 2008 Oceania Champions Cup. He joined Waikato in 2010. Finally retiring from premiership level at the end of 2015 having played 44 matches during his career at that level.

Jeff's father, Clive Campbell also represented New Zealand at international level. His brother Scott Campbell, played alongside him by Takapuna AFC.

Professional career
Following unsuccessful trials with Wollongong Wolves and Sydney United, Campbell became a member of New Zealand's first professional football team, Football Kingz FC, in February 2000. On 3 March he played against the Australian league leaders, Sydney Olympic, scoring two goals in the second half to give the Kingz its first victory. He made 76 appearances for the Kingz between 2000 and 2004 with his contributions being pivotal at times. 

In 2001 he signed for Australian club Adelaide City. He played only one match for Adelaide after it transpired he had been suffering from an injury when he joined the club, despite signing a two-year contract. Campbell subsequently returned to the Football Kingz, later signing for English sides AFC Wimbledon and Hendon before returning to New Zealand in 2006.

In September 2000, Campbell won the New Zealand Soccer Media Association young player of the year award, ahead of fellow nominees Chris Killen of Manchester City and Allan Pearce of Barnsley.

International career
Campbell had represented New Zealand at under-20 and under-23 level, but was in line for selection to the Australian senior national team for the 2000 Summer Olympics. However, he was instead selected by the New Zealand senior team and debuted for his country in 2000 in a friendly match against Jamaica. Campbell went on to win 16 caps for New Zealand, scoring 5 goals. He was also named in the squad to play against South Africa. Later that year he played in their matches against Malaysia.

In 2002 he played in the Oceania Nations Cup for New Zealand scoring two goals to assist in them winning Group B.

In 2007 he was called up again to New Zealand as a midfielder.

In 2008 Campbell was in the squad that played Fiji.

He was again named in the 2009 squad.

References

External links

National team stats
 2007/2008 season stats - NZFC

1979 births
Living people
New Zealand association footballers
New Zealand international footballers
Expatriate soccer players in Australia
Expatriate footballers in England
National Soccer League (Australia) players
Adelaide City FC players
Hendon F.C. players
AFC Wimbledon players
Auckland City FC players
Football Kingz F.C. players
Waitakere United players
Association football midfielders
New Zealand Football Championship players
2000 OFC Nations Cup players
2002 OFC Nations Cup players
2008 OFC Nations Cup players